is a serial novel created by Katsuyuki Sumisawa based on the New Mobile Report Gundam Wing anime series. It was serialized in Gundam Ace between August 2010 and November 2015 and was collected in thirteen volumes. It follows the story decades after Endless Waltz.

Setting
Frozen Teardrop is set during the Mars Century, the era that has succeeded the After Colony era, on the terraformed Mars. Since the formation of the young Mars Colony and its government, trouble has been brewing within it with the assassination of its President, Milliardo Peacecraft. In the present day, ESUN President Dorothy T. Catalonia authorizes the beginning of "Operation Mythos" to resolve the problems on Mars - which primarily involves the assassination of Relena Peacecraft.

Concurrent to the events of Mars Century are flashbacks during After Colony, told through Preventer agent Kathy Po, the daughter of Sally Po. The flashbacks detail events in After Colony leading up to the events of the series, including the origins and backgrounds of OZ Leader Treize Khushrenada and Gundam pilot Heero Yuy.

Characters

Sally Po's daughter. A Preventer sent to Mars by the ESUN president Dorothy T. Catalonia to initiate Operation Mythos.

Head of the Mars Branch of Preventer. He is confirmed to be Chang Wufei, the Gundam pilot.

Although he is dressed in a priest's clothing, he claims to be the father of the child Duo Maxwell.  He is the original Duo Maxwell, the Gundam pilot.

Son of Father Maxwell. He is named after his father, the Gundam pilot. He appeared one day at Duo and Hilde's orphanage and while Hilde believes he is the son of Duo and some woman, Duo claims that he had to be conceived during their short marriage.

Novel list

References

Mobile Suit Gundam Wing
Japanese serial novels